Nibali is a surname of Italian origin. People with that name include:

 Antonio Nibali (born 1992), Italian professional road racing cyclist, brother of Vincenzo
 Vincenzo Nibali (born 1984), Italian professional road racing cyclist, brother of Antonio

See also
 

Surnames of Italian origin